Leigh Diffey (born 3 March 1971) is an Australian American auto racing commentator. His career began calling motorcycle races in his home country before moving to the United Kingdom to cover other forms of motorsport. Diffey then moved to the United States to join Speed Channel, while simultaneously working for Network Ten in Australia. Since 2013, he has served as a play-by-play announcer and studio host with NBC Sports in the United States.

Early career: Network Ten and BBC 
Diffey grew up in Queensland, Australia where he briefly raced motorcycles with his friend Daryl Beattie, who eventually became a professional motorcycle racer. Diffey, meanwhile, pursued a career in motorsports broadcasting; his first job came in 1990 at the age of 19, calling Ipswich Motorcycle Club racing at Tivoli Raceway. Diffey also worked as a physical education teacher at Ipswich Grammar School; he left in 1995 to pursue a full-time career in television and sportscasting.

Prior to his move to the United States, Diffey commentated on the Superbike World Championship and presented coverage of the World Rally Championship for the BBC in the United Kingdom, working alongside Steve Parrish and Suzi Perry. Additionally, Diffey covered V8 Supercars with Greg Rust, Barry Sheene, Bill Woods and Mark Oastler, as well as Formula One racing, both for Network Ten. He also covered the 12 Hours of Sebring, an event for he would call for a total of ten years.

2003–2012: Speed Channel and return to Network Ten 
In 2001, Diffey moved to the US to cover the American-based open-wheel racing CART series, while still working for the BBC. Two years later in 2003, Diffey made a full-time move to the States when he was hired by Speed Channel, which later simply became "Speed". At Speed, Diffey was the play-by-play announcer for the network's coverage of the Speed World Challenge, the American Le Mans Series, the Rolex Sports Car Series, the Rolex Grand-Am Cup, the SCCA Trans-Am Series, and a regular anchor of The Speed Report and Speed Center. Diffey occasionally filled in for Speed commentator Bob Varsha during the network's Formula One broadcasts. He also commentated selected rounds of the AMA Superbike and AMA Motocross Championships.

Diffey worked with Speed to call several sports car races during his tenure with the network, including the 24 Hours of Daytona and the 24 Hours of Le Mans. While at Speed, Diffey also occasionally returned to Network Ten in Australia as a regular host for the network's nightly sports wrap, Sports Tonight. He also covered other two other sports for the Australian network: sailing, hosting coverage of the Sydney to Hobart Yacht Race, and golf, which he covered for five years. In 2011 alone, he covered no fewer than sixteen individual divisions of motorsport on Speed.

2013–present: NBC Sports

Motorsports

Formula One and IndyCar 
In November 2012, NBC Sports announced that Diffey would join its network to become the play-by-play announcer for its broadcasts of both Formula One and IndyCar events starting in 2013. Diffey called the day of the announcement "one of the best days of my life. People have been so complimentary." The announcement named David Hobbs and Steve Matchett as the analysts who would work alongside him for the Formula One broadcasts. In December 2015, Diffey, Hobbs and Matchett were given an Honorable Mention in a list of Best Broadcast Teams of the year published on the Sports Illustrated website SI.com.

On two occasions, Diffey covered both series on the same day. On 23 August 2015, he called the Belgian Grand Prix from NBC's base in Stamford, Connecticut, before he and Matchett traveled to Pocono Raceway for the ABC Supply 500. Likewise, on 3 September 2017, Diffey called the Italian Grand Prix in Connecticut and then traveled to Watkins Glen International for the IndyCar Grand Prix at The Glen. Diffey's open-wheel focus shifted solely to IndyCar in 2018 when the US Formula One television rights were transferred to ESPN.

NASCAR 
Diffey was one of several recurring co-hosts of NASCAR America, a weekday NBCSN program dedicated to NASCAR. While he had covered NASCAR practice and qualifying sessions with Speed, it was not until his tenure with NBC that he made his NASCAR debut as a play-by-play announcer for a race, covering the Xfinity Series (NXS) at Mid-Ohio Sports Car Course on 15 August 2015. After calling the race, Diffey spoke of the experience as "a thrill...I've been a NASCAR fan and dabbled in it, and for that to be my first race was something else." He also commentated the Richmond, Dover, and Kansas NXS races.

Diffey made his Sprint Cup Series broadcasting debut alongside Dale Jarrett at Homestead-Miami Speedway in 2015, leading NBCSN's "Hot Pass" coverage of NASCAR's championship race, which focused solely on the four drivers still eligible for the series championship. Diffey reprised this role with Parker Kligerman in the 2016 Homestead race, and again with Jarrett in 2017, 2018, and 2019.

In August 2017, Diffey served as the lead announcer for NASCAR on NBCs primary coverage of the renamed Monster Energy Cup Series for two races (Watkins Glen and Michigan), filling in for regular announcer Rick Allen who was working in London with NBC's coverage of the 2017 IAAF World Championships.

Global Rallycross 
Diffey served as lead announcer for several events of NBCSN's coverage of Red Bull Global Rallycross beginning with the opening event from Fort Lauderdale in the 2015 season. He continued to cover the series for the network until the series folded, doing play-by-play for the final round of the 2017 season from the Port of Los Angeles on 14 October.

Dakar Rally 
Diffey serves as the US announcer for the daily world feed highlight broadcast of the Dakar Rally on NBCSN.

IMSA 
Diffey returned to sports car racing in 2019 as the lead announcer for NBC Sports' coverage of IMSA's WeatherTech SportsCar Championship, beginning with the 2019 24 Hours of Daytona.

Motorcycles 
Diffey began calling the AMA Supercross Championship in 2020, working play-by-play for NBC for the series along with Ralph Sheheen. 
Diffey took over the lead commentating role replacing Sheheen starting the 2021 season with Ricky Carmichael, Daniel Blair, and Will Christien.
He also served as a studio host for the network's MotoGP and Moto2 coverage.

Other sports 
Diffey has worked on NBC's coverage of the Olympic Games, covering luge, skeleton, and bobsled at the 2014 Winter Games in Sochi. NBC executive Sam Flood had expressed interest in having him serve as an announcer outside of motorsports while negotiating his contract with the network, and he prepared Diffey for the Olympics by having him host the Penn Relays and the Luge World Cup. Diffey remarked of serving in the Olympics: "Never in my wildest dreams did I imagine this is where my career would take me. Just working for NBC, that alone made my life. Now going to the Olympics for NBC? I just pinch myself as if to wonder is this really happening?" He returned to the Olympics to cover rowing at the 2016 Summer Olympics in Rio de Janeiro, and also called the same events he had in Sochi at the 2018 Winter Games in Pyongchang.

Beyond the Olympics, Diffey has covered rugby, anchoring studio coverage of Premiership Rugby and doing play-by-play for the Collegiate Rugby Championship. He also covered the Prefontaine Classic in 2018, as well as the 2019 World Athletics Championships.

In 2021, Diffey took over as the NBC track and field commentator, covering both the US Olympic trials and the 2020 Summer Olympics.

Personal life 
Diffey obtained his United States citizenship in 2011, explaining, "This country has given me so much, and I felt I needed to give back. That's why I accepted US citizenship. I'm Australian and I'm also American." A former resident of Charlotte, North Carolina, he currently resides in Connecticut with his wife and two children.

References

External links
 

Olympic Games broadcasters
1971 births
Living people
American sports announcers
American people of Australian descent
Australian sports broadcasters
Motorsport announcers
Australian television presenters
Australian sports journalists
Australian car collectors
Track and field broadcasters